The RMS Franconia was an ocean liner operated by the Cunard Line. She was launched on 23 July 1910 at the Swan, Hunter & Wigham Richardson Wallsend shipyard. Franconia was intended for the line's Boston service, being the largest ship of the time to enter Boston harbor, with winter service in the New York-Mediterranean cruising service.

Her maiden voyage in February 1911, was between Liverpool and Boston, USA.
She was nicknamed the "bathroom ship" as she had more bathrooms and showers on board than the Mauretania.
She was unusual, as she did not have staterooms on the upper deck, instead she had a library, gymnasium and a lounge and smoking room.

She completed her final crossing from Liverpool to Boston on 22 September 1914, by which time she had carried 52,695 passengers westbound to Boston. Her final crossing from Liverpool to New York was completed on 1 February 1915 at which point she had carried 18,505 passengers to New York (7,096 on her Liverpool service, 11,409 on her Mediterranean service) for a combined total of 71,200 westbound passengers. Additionally, between Cunard's New York and Boston services, Franconia also carried 26,328 passengers eastbound to Liverpool.

After several years service primarily in the North Atlantic, she was taken into service as a troop transport in early 1915. On 4 October 1916, while heading for Salonika, she was torpedoed and sunk by the German U-boat UB-47 195 miles east of Malta. She was not carrying any troops but out of her 314 crew members, 12 died. The others were saved by the hospital ship Dover Castle.

References

External links
Notes about Cunard liners
Franconia at www.thegreatoceanliners.com 

Ships of the Cunard Line
World War I merchant ships of the United Kingdom
Maritime incidents in 1916
World War I shipwrecks in the Mediterranean Sea
Ships sunk by German submarines in World War I
1910 ships
Ships built by Swan Hunter